Ammameh, is a village combining the villages of Ammameh-ye Bala and Ammameh-ye Pain in the Rudbar-e Qasran Rural District of Rudbar-e Qasran District, Shemiranat County, Tehran province, Iran. At the 2006 National Census, its population was 747 in 210 households. The following census in 2011 counted 1,262 people in 408 households. The latest census in 2016 showed a population of 1,336 people in 439 households; it was the largest village in its rural district.

Villages
Ammameh-ye Bala
Ammameh-e Bala ( (Romanized as Ammāmeh-e Bālā; also known as Ammāmeh-ye Deh-e Bālā), is a village whose 2006 National Census population was 675 in 188 households. The following census in 2011 counted 1,066 people in 349 households. The latest census in 2016 showed a population of 1,315 people in 429 households.

Ammameh-ye Pain
Ammameh-e Pain ( (Romanized as Ammāmeh-e Pā’īn or ‘Amāmeh-ye Pā’īn; also known as Ammāmeh-ye Deh-e Pā’īn and Umam-i-Paīn) had, at the time of 2006 National Census, a population of 72 in 22 households. The following census in 2011 counted 196 people in 59 households. The latest census in 2016 showed a population of 21 people in 10 households.

References 

Shemiranat County

Populated places in Tehran Province

Populated places in Shemiranat County